Tachycines (Gymnaeta) bifurcatus is a species of camel cricket in the Aemodogryllinae subfamily.  This species was first described in 2010 by Gorochov, under its synonym Diestrammena bifurcata.

References

Rhaphidophoridae
Insects described in 1967